Daulet Sarsenuly  Kenbayev (Däulet Särsenūly Kenbaev; born July 12, 1992) is a Kazakhstani professional ice hockey center currently playing for the Barys Astana in the Kontinental Hockey League (KHL).

Career statistics

Regular season

International

External links

1992 births
Sportspeople from Oskemen
Barys Nur-Sultan players
Kazakhstani ice hockey centres
Living people
Nomad Astana players
Snezhnye Barsy players
Universiade medalists in ice hockey
Universiade silver medalists for Kazakhstan
Competitors at the 2015 Winter Universiade